National Highway 1 (NR1), literally "The Road to Mandalay ") is an important south–north flowing highway of central Burma and the busiest road in the country. It connects Yangon to Meiktila where it joins the National Highway 4 going east and then NR1 continues north to Mandalay.

Roads in Myanmar